Richard Edmunds (born December 5, 1937) is an American former sprinter.

External links 

 Profile at trackfield.brinkster.net

1937 births
Living people
American male sprinters
Place of birth missing (living people)
Pan American Games gold medalists for the United States
Athletes (track and field) at the 1963 Pan American Games
Pan American Games medalists in athletics (track and field)
Medalists at the 1963 Pan American Games